Vampire Themes is a various artists compilation album released in 1997 by Cleopatra Records. The album comprises songs from several industrial and gothic rock bands.

Reception

AllMusic gave Vampire Themes a rating of two and a half out of five possible stars.

Track listing

Personnel
Adapted from the Vampire Themes liner notes.

 Carl Edwards – design
 Judson Leach – mastering

Release history

References

External links 
 Vampire Themes at Discogs (list of releases)

1997 compilation albums
Cleopatra Records compilation albums